Sudarshan Baral is a Nepalese politician, belonging to the Communist Party of Nepal (Maoist). He was arrested in October 2004. In 2007, he was appointed to the interim parliament.

In the 2008 Constituent Assembly election he was elected from the Gulmi-1 constituency, winning 14165 votes.

References

Living people
Communist Party of Nepal (Maoist Centre) politicians
Nepalese atheists
Year of birth missing (living people)
Provincial cabinet ministers of Nepal
Members of the Provincial Assembly of Lumbini Province

Members of the 1st Nepalese Constituent Assembly